CNL can refer to:

 Allensworth State Park station, California, United States, special-arrangement Amtrak station with code CNL
 Centre national du livre, French Government agency
 CNL Financial Group, previously Commercial Net Lease
 The National Literature Centre, the national literary archive of Luxembourg
 The Commissioners of Northern Lighthouses, now known as the Northern Lighthouse Board
 Compute Node Linux, a Linux-based operating system used with Cray supercomputers
Clinical nurse leader
Columbia, Newberry and Laurens Railroad
Controlled natural languages
Computer Networks Laboratory
CityNightLine, a former night train network in Germany and neighboring countries
Sindal Airport, Denmark (IATA code CNL)
Canley railway station, West Midlands, three letter station code
Chronic neutrophilic leukemia
Canadian Nuclear Laboratories, formerly the Chalk River Laboratories
CONCACAF Nations League, an international association football competition involving the men's national teams of CONCACAF's member associations